Harry Fleer (March 26, 1916 – October 14, 1994) was an American actor. He appeared in more than sixty films and television shows between 1955 and 1994.

Fleer was cast six times from 1957 to 1960 on the syndicated television anthology series, Death Valley Days, hosted by Stanley Andrews. In "The Camel Train" (1957), he played Secretary of War Jefferson Davis, who commissions an experiment of using camels in the southwestern desert country headed by Lieutenant Edward Fitzgerald Beale, played by Stanley Lachman. Later, he was Wyatt Earp in "Birth of a Boom" (1958).

Filmography

References

External links

1916 births
1994 deaths
20th-century American male actors
American male film actors
American male television actors
Male actors from Illinois
Actors from Quincy, Illinois